An éclair is a pastry made with choux dough filled with a cream and topped with a flavored icing. The dough, which is the same as that used for profiterole, is typically piped into an oblong shape with a pastry bag and baked until it is crisp and hollow inside. Once cool, the pastry is filled with custard (crème pâtissière), whipped cream or chiboust cream, then iced with fondant icing. Other fillings include pistachio- and rum-flavoured custard, fruit-flavoured fillings, or chestnut purée. The icing is sometimes caramel, in which case the dessert may be called a bâton de Jacob. A similar pastry in a round rather than oblong shape is called a Religieuse.

Etymology

The word comes from the French , meaning "flash of lightning", so named because it is eaten quickly (in a flash); however some believe that the name is due to the glistening of the frosting resembling lightning.

History
The éclair originated during the nineteenth century in Lyon, in France where it was called "pain à la Duchesse" or "petite duchesse" until 1850. The word is first attested both in English and in French in the 1860s.

North America
Dunkin' Donuts markets Long John doughnuts as eclairs in the United States.
National Eclair Day is celebrated on June 22 in the U.S.

See also

 French cuisine
 List of choux pastry dishes
 List of custard desserts
 List of French desserts

References

Bibliography

External links

 A brief éclair history

Belgian cuisine
Custard desserts
French pastries
Choux pastry
Chocolate-covered foods
Doughnuts
Stuffed desserts